Summer of the Monkeys is a 1976 children's story written by Wilson Rawls. It was published by Doubleday (later released by Yearling Books) and was the winner of the William Allen White Book Award and the California Young Reader Medal.

Plot summary
The book is set about the end of the nineteenth  century. The protagonist is a 14-year-old boy named Jay Berry Lee, who had enjoyed an idyllic childhood.  Born to Missouri sharecroppers, he moves with his family to Oklahoma after his grandfather offers them free land.  Daisy, his sister, has a crippled leg, and they devote much effort to gaining enough money to pay for reconstructive surgery.  One day, while looking for their lost milk cow, Jay Berry discovers monkeys in a nearby river bottom.  Visiting his grandfather's store, he learns that they have escaped from a traveling circus, which has offered a vast reward for their capture: $100 for the chief monkey, "Jimbo", and $2 each for the others.  Jay Berry makes multiple attempts to capture them using traps and a net borrowed from his grandfather, but he gains only scratches and bites from them, at one point even losing his pants in the process.

Under the direction of his grandfather, Jay Berry contacts the circus and is advised to attempt to befriend Jimbo.  Upon returning to the monkeys' grove, he finds them around a hidden still; the drunken monkeys indeed befriend him, but their gesture of friendship is a gift of whiskey that leaves him drunk.  After returning to his shocked family, he goes with his grandfather to a nearby town to visit the library and discover alternate methods of monkey-catching.  Having bought supplies, they return home, but the monkeys steal it all.

Daisy discovers a fairy ring, and believing it capable of granting wishes, secretly wishes that Jay Berry may be able to buy the pony and rifle that he has long desired.  Soon afterward, a fierce storm frightens the monkeys into accompanying him into captivity, and he quickly returns them to the circus for his reward.  Although he considers buying the pony and rifle, he chooses to finance Daisy's surgery instead.  By the conclusion, he and his grandfather have accumulated enough money to buy him a paint pony. Daisy was able to gather enough money to get him a .22 gun while she was in the city.

Film adaptation

Summer of the Monkeys is a 1998 American family adventure-drama film directed by Michael Anderson and stars Corey Sevier as Jay Berry Lee, a young boy who discovers circus monkeys living in the forest near his home. The movie also stars Michael Ontkean and Leslie Hope as Jay Berry's parents, as well as Katie Stuart, Don Francks, and Wilford Brimley.

The book was made into the movie in 1997 by Edge Productions in Saskatoon, Saskatchewan and received a limited theatrical release in both Canada and the United States in 1998 and was released on home video in the United States by Walt Disney Home Video, a subsidiary of Buena Vista Home Entertainment, Inc.

References

1976 American novels
American children's novels
Children's historical novels
Children's novels about animals
Novels set in Oklahoma
Doubleday (publisher) books
American novels adapted into films
1976 children's books